"It Was a Good Day" is a song by American rapper Ice Cube, released on February 23, 1993 as the second single from his third solo album, The Predator (1992). The song peaked at No. 7 on the Billboard Hot R&B/Hip-Hop Songs chart and No. 27 on the UK Charts. On the Billboard Hot 100, the song peaked at No. 15, making it Ice Cube's highest-charting single on the chart to date. "It Was a Good Day" was ranked at No. 81 on the list of greatest rap songs of all time by About.com, No. 77 on VH1's 100 Greatest Songs of the 90s, No. 36 on Rolling Stone 100 Greatest Hip-Hop Songs of All Time, and No. 352 on the latter's list of Top 500 Best Songs of All Time. In 2008, the song was ranked at No. 28 on VH1's 100 greatest hip-hop songs.

Background
Ice Cube originally recorded a demo of "It Was a Good Day" in his home studio, and later went on to record the album version in Los Angeles at Echo Sound Studios in 1992, where it was one of the first ideas for his upcoming album. Ice Cube commented on the concept behind the song explaining,

Initially, Ice Cube went into the studio with a sample of the Isley Brothers' "Footsteps in the Dark". DJ Pooh later enhanced the production with bass and vocals. The song has been re-released multiple times, including on Ice Cube's Greatest Hits album, Bootlegs & B-Sides, and The N.W.A Legacy, Vol. 1: 1988–1998.

"It Was a Good Day" samples the Isley Brothers' "Footsteps in the Dark, Pts. 1&2" and "Sexy Mama" by The Moments.

Date of the "Good Day"
In a 2012 Tumblr post, stand-up comedian Donovan Strain used clues from the lyrics of the song to determine that the titular "Good Day" likely occurred on January 20, 1992. Strain claims, "The only day where Yo! MTV Raps was on air, it was a clear and smogless day in Los Angeles, beepers or pagers were commercially sold, Lakers beat the SuperSonics, and Ice Cube had no filming commitments was January 20, 1992." Deadspin later followed up by fact-checking some of the claims made by Strain.

However, Internet sleuths have noted several inconsistencies in Strain's reasoning. For example, it was reported that Yo! MTV Raps did not air that day in 1992, and, "It is unlikely that Ice Cube got 'a beep from Kim' for a booty call since the likely Kim, Ice Cube's fiancée by 1992, was eight-months pregnant at the time." Due to these errors, an alternative date has been calculated by one blogger, pointing to November 30, 1988.

Ice Cube, however, has stated that the day described in the song never actually occurred and is made up of things that happened on a number of different days:

Goodyear response
In 2014, Ice Cube agreed to support a fundraising campaign started by four close friends, who described themselves as "diehard rap aficionados", wanting to raise and donate $25,000 for the South Los Angeles charity A Place Called Home (APCH), an after-school youth center, if the Goodyear Blimp would display the lyrics "Even saw the lights of the Goodyear Blimp / And it read 'Ice Cube's a pimp'" from the third verse of "It Was a Good Day". After Ice Cube spoke about the fundraising campaign on Late Night with Jimmy Fallon, Goodyear quickly agreed. However, given the nature of the fundraiser and the organization, Goodyear decided against using the word "pimp", and instead, flew the blimp with messages including, "Today is A Good Day", and "Flying For a Good Cause -- A Place Called Home."

Reception
The song was universally acclaimed by critics. AllMusic's Jason Birchmeier noted that even though it was The Predator's "most laid-back moment, [it] emits a quiet sense of violent anxiety." He further stated that the song was, "a truly beautiful moment, a career highlight for sure." Blender magazine writer, Michael Odel, felt that the song contained, "a chilled-out, feel-good vibe". Greg Sandow from Entertainment Weekly mentioned that Ice Cube rapped over a "partly melancholy, partly swaggering beat [and] glories in good luck, South Central style". Robert Hilburn from Los Angeles Times wrote, "Here is another one of pop’s most gifted--and often misunderstood--artists. The images are a bit bawdy, but the track [...] is noteworthy for the way this controversial rapper reveals a welcome tender side." In his weekly UK chart commentary, James Masterton said, "Thus it is that when Ice Cube finally crosses over and gets his first UK hit, it is with "It Was a Good Day" a laid-back mellow rap, far removed from his usual uncompromising throwdown and may even stand a chance of crossing over even further." 

Jon Selzer from Melody Maker felt it's "so laid back and pastoral it could almost be DJ Jazzy Jeff & the Fresh Prince, but its tale of cruising and getting laid is undercut with a darker edge." Alan Jones from Music Week gave the song three out of five, declaring it as "a rare low-key offering from the controversial rapper [that] inevitably mentions his bete noir — cops — but is an unusually optimistic celebration, set against samples from the Isley Brothers and the Moments." He added, "Likely to appeal to a wide audience, with good radio potential." Another editor, Andy Beevers, also gave it three out of five, writing that the song "sees Ice Cube in an uncharacteristically mellow and reflective mood. Its more commercial sound should reach beyond his fan base." Charles Aaron from Spin commented, "Outta the disastrous, misanthropic morass of The Predator emerges this way-too-real gangsta fairy tale. Cube is firing wildly in the wilderness, but don't toe-tag him yet." Vibe magazine described DJ Pooh's beat as a "smoothed-out production".

Music video
The accompanying music video for "It Was a Good Day" was directed by F. Gary Gray and was first aired in March 1993. It was published on YouTube in February 2009. The video has amassed more than 150 million views as of October 2021.

The music video follows the song's lyrics, with Ice Cube waking up in the morning, eating breakfast with his family, driving around in his green 1964 Chevrolet Impala, winning a pickup game of street basketball, avoiding police, going over to a friend's house, watching Yo! MTV Raps, winning games of craps and dominoes, and thanking God for no gang violence–related deaths during the day. Later, he picks up an old 12th-grade crush named Kim; they drink, smoke, watch an NBA game, and have sex; he then drives her home and goes to Fatburger. At the end of the video, as Ice Cube is about to enter his house, police cars and helicopters surround him, but he ignores them and enters his house with police following behind him with text onscreen saying "To Be Continued...", setting up the plot for the music video to Ice Cube's following single "Check Yo Self".

Legacy
"It Was a Good Day" reached #77 on VH1's 100 Greatest Songs of the '90s. The song was also included in About.com's Top 100 Rap Songs, at number 81. In 2008, it was ranked #28 on VH1's 100 Greatest Songs of Hip Hop.

Charts

Weekly charts

Year-end charts

Certifications

References

External links

1993 singles
Ice Cube songs
Music videos directed by F. Gary Gray
Songs written by Ice Cube
1992 songs
Song recordings produced by DJ Pooh
Priority Records singles
Los Angeles Lakers
Seattle SuperSonics
G-funk songs